HNoMS Utstein is a series of three submarines operated by the Royal Norwegian Navy.  They were named after a historic Utstein Abbey which is located on the island of Klosterøy in Rennesøy, Norway.  The three submarines that have borne this name are:

 was a British V-class submarine launched in 1943 (under a different name) and sold to Norway in 1946.  The Norwegian Navy renamed it Utstein.  It was struck in 1964.
 was a  launched on 19 May 1965 by Rheinstahl Nordsee in Emden, Germany. It was completed on 15 September 1965.  The ship was converted into a museum in 1998.
 is a  launched 25 April 1991 by Thyssen Nordseewerke in Emden, Germany.  The submarine was still active in 2009.

References

Royal Norwegian Navy ship names